The year 1798 in architecture involved some significant events.

Buildings and structures

Buildings

 September 2 – Opening of the Teatro Comunale (Ferrara) in Italy, designed by Cosimo Morelli and Antonio Foschini.
 Building of the first major example of Egyptian Revival architecture, Karlsruhe Synagogue in Baden, designed by Friedrich Weinbrenner.
 Completion of the neoclassical summer retreat at Castle Coole in Northern Ireland, designed by James Wyatt.
 Completion of the theatre and summer retreat at Ostankino Palace near Moscow.
 Completion of the Massachusetts State House in Boston, designed by Charles Bulfinch.
 Completion of the Royal Chapel of St. Anthony of La Florida in Madrid, designed by Felipe Fontana.
 Completion of the İzzet Mehmet Pasha Mosque in Safranbolu, Turkey.
 Completion of first São João National Theatre in Porto, Portugal as an opera house, designed by Vicente Mazzoneschi.
 Opening of the Teatro della Concordia in Iesi, Ancona.
 Building of Bewdley Bridge over the River Severn in England, designed by Thomas Telford.
 Opening of the skew Store Street Aqueduct on the Ashton Canal in Manchester, designed by Benjamin Outram.
 Completion of remodelling of Romney's House, Hampstead, London, to incorporate a studio and gallery, designed by Samuel Bunce.

Births
 May 8 – Joseph Welland, Irish architect (died 1860)
 June 27 – Joseph John Scoles, English Catholic architect (died 1863)
 October 14 – Félix Duban, French architect (died 1870)

Deaths
 June 25 – Thomas Sandby, English watercolour artist and architect (born 1721)
 November 2 – Charles de Wailly, French architect (born 1730)
 December 10 – Laurynas Gucevičius, Lithuanian architect (born 1753)

References

Architecture
Years in architecture
18th-century architecture